The Pennsylvania and Ohio Canal, also known as the P & O Canal, the Cross Cut Canal and the Mahoning Canal was a shipping canal which operated from 1840 until 1877 (though the canal was completely abandoned by 1872).  It was unique in that it served to connect canals in two states (the Ohio and Erie Canal in Ohio and the Beaver and Erie Canal in Pennsylvania) and was funded by private interests.

History 
In Warren, Ohio, at a convention held on November 13, 1833, 109 delegates decided to privately fund the Pennsylvania and Ohio Canal as neither state felt it should spend money on a canal that led to another state. Construction began on September 17, 1835, when the two engineers of the canal struck iron stakes in the ground at the center of what was known as the "Portage Summit" between what is now Kent, Ohio, and Ravenna. It ran from New Castle, Pennsylvania, to Akron, Ohio, meeting the Ohio and Erie Canal in downtown Akron. It ran along old Native American trails and the Cuyahoga and Mahoning Rivers. In Northeast Ohio, Lake Pippen and Brady Lake were water sources for the canal. Large celebrations occurred along the canal's route when it officially opened on August 4, 1840.

Impact 
As with other canals in the region, mules and horses pulled the canal boats that navigated the P & O. Using this and other canals, goods and passengers were ferried from Pittsburgh to Cleveland and Lake Erie. This contributed to trade between Northeast Ohio and other Eastern states making towns and villages along the canal larger and more prosperous. Some have also credited the canal with the development of the iron ore industry in the Mahoning Valley in Ohio.

Closing 
With the arrival and expansion of railroads, the canal gradually diminished.  All sections of the canal were abandoned by 1872 and the canal was officially closed in 1877 and all remaining property was sold off. Today, traces of the canal's bed remain in many areas of Northeast Ohio including Munroe Falls and downtown Kent, where the Cuyahoga River runs through the former canal lock.  A P & O Canal culvert, sometimes referred to as an aqueduct, remains in southern Kent over Plum Creek just south of the Cuyahoga River.

See also
List of canals in the United States
Ohio and Erie Canal

References

External links 
Ohio Historical Society article on the P & O Canal
 Map & Profiles, of the Pennsylvania and Ohio Canal, from Akron 

Trumbull County Historical Society write-up on the canal
Rails & Trails Transportation History Map Sources for P&O Canal

Canals in Ohio
Canals in Pennsylvania
History of Kent, Ohio
Landmarks in Ohio
Transportation buildings and structures in Lawrence County, Pennsylvania
Transportation in Mahoning County, Ohio
Transportation in Portage County, Ohio
Transportation in Summit County, Ohio
Transportation in Trumbull County, Ohio
Canals opened in 1840
1840 establishments in Pennsylvania